Good Housekeeping is an American women's magazine featuring articles about women's interests, product testing by The Good Housekeeping Institute, recipes, diet, and health, as well as literary articles. It is well known for the "Good Housekeeping Seal", a limited warranty program that is popularly known as the "Good Housekeeping Seal of Approval".

Good Housekeeping was founded in 1885 by American publisher and poet Clark W. Bryan. By the time of its acquisition by the Hearst Corporation in 1911, the magazine had grown to a circulation of 300,000 subscribers. By the early 1960s, it had over 5 million subscribers and was one of the world's most popular women's magazines.

History and profile

On May 2, 1885, Clark W. Bryan founded Good Housekeeping in Holyoke, Massachusetts as a fortnightly magazine.  The magazine became a monthly publication in 1891.

The magazine achieved a circulation of 300,000 by 1911, at which time it was bought by the Hearst Corporation. It topped one million in the mid-1920s, and continued to rise, even during the Great Depression and its aftermath.  In 1938, a year in which the magazine advertising dropped 22 percent, Good Housekeeping showed an operating profit of $2,583,202, more than three times the profit of Hearst's other eight magazines combined, and probably the most profitable monthly of its time.  Circulation topped 2,500,000 in 1943, 3,500,000 in the mid-1950s, 5,000,000 in 1962, and 5,500,000 per month in 1966.  1959 profits were more than $11 million.

Good Housekeeping was one of the "Seven Sisters", a group of women's service magazines, and is one of the three of them still published in print.

In 1922, the Hearst Corporation created a British edition along the same lines, named British Good Housekeeping.

Famous writers who have contributed to the magazine include A. J. Cronin, Betty Friedan, Frances Parkinson Keyes, Clara Savage Littledale, Edwin Markham, Somerset Maugham, Edna St. Vincent Millay, J. D. Salinger, Evelyn Waugh, and Virginia Woolf. Other contributors include advice columnists, chefs, and politicians.

Good Housekeeping Research Institute 

In 1900, the  "Experiment Station", the predecessor to the Good Housekeeping Research Institute (GHRI), was founded. In 1902, the magazine was calling this "An Inflexible Contract Between the Publisher and Each Subscriber."  The formal opening of the headquarters of GHRI – the Model Kitchen, Testing Station for Household Devices, and Domestic Science Laboratory – occurred in January 1910.

In 1909, the magazine established the Good Housekeeping Seal of Approval. Products advertised in the magazine that bear the seal are tested by GHRI and are backed by a two-year limited warranty. About 5,000 products have been given the seal.

In April 1912, a year after Hearst bought the magazine, Harvey W. Wiley, the first commissioner of the U.S. Food and Drug Administration (1907–1912), became head of GHRI and a contributing editor whose "Question Box" feature ran for decades. Beginning with a "Beauty Clinic" in 1932, departments were added to the Institute, including a "Baby's Center", "Foods and Cookery", and a "Needlework Room".  Some functioned as testing laboratories, while others were designed to produce editorial copy.

After the passage of the Food, Drug, and Cosmetic Act in 1938, Assistant Secretary of Agriculture Rexford Tugwell sought to promote a government grading system.  The Hearst Corporation opposed the policy in spirit, and began publishing a monthly tabloid attacking federal oversight.  In 1939, the Federal Trade Commission filed a complaint against Good Housekeeping for "misleading and deceptive" guarantees including its Seal of Approval, and "exaggerated and false" claims in its advertisements.  The publisher fought the proceedings for two years, during which time competing editors from the Ladies Home Journal and McCall's testified against Good Housekeeping.  The FTC's ultimate ruling was against the magazine, forcing it to remove some claims and phraseology from its ad pages.  The words "Tested and Approved" were dropped from the Seal of Approval.  But the magazine's popularity was unaffected, steadily rising in circulation and profitability. In 1962, the wording of the Seal was changed to a guarantee of "Product or Performance", while dropping its endorsement of rhetorical promises made by the advertisers. In its varying forms, the Seal of Approval became inextricably associated with the magazine, and many others (e.g., McCall's, Parents Magazine, and Better Homes and Gardens) mimicked the practice.

In 2012, the test kitchen of the Good Housekeeping Research Institute was implemented into a new instructional cooking, nutrition, and exercise TV show on the Cooking Channel, entitled Drop 5 lbs with Good Housekeeping.

International editions
Good Housekeeping began to be published in the United Kingdom in 1922. William Randolph Hearst appointed Alice Maud Head initially as assistant editor. Head rose to be the Managing Director, as well as purportedly being the highest paid woman in Europe. As Hearst's deputy, Head would make decisions on his behalf about not just editing, but also buying for him St Donat's Castle, expensive art objects, and three giraffes for his zoo. Head remained head until 1939.

In Latin America, the magazine was known as Buenhogar. It was published in the United States and Latin America by Editorial Televisa.

American editors
Clark W. Bryan (1885–1898)
James Eaton Tower (1899–1913)
William Frederick Bigelow (1913–1942)
Herbert Raymond Mayes (1942–1958)
Wade Hampton Nichols Jr. (1959–1975)
John Mack Carter (1975–1994)
Ellen Levine (1994–2006)
Rosemary Ellis (2006–2013)
Jane Francisco (2013–present)

See also
Consumer Reports
John Cecil Clay
Nat Mags (UK publisher)

References

External links 

Official web sites:
 U.S. edition, including the Good Housekeeping Institute
 U.K. edition, including the Good Housekeeping Institute
 Indian edition
 Russian edition
 Official subscription site Spanish edition BuenHogar
 Online archive  of the covers of many early issues
 Official website of the Drop 5 lbs with Good Housekeeping TV show on the Cooking Channel

From the Library of Congress:
 February 1926 issue (262 pages)
 Today in History: May 2, featuring Good Housekeeping
Good Housekeeping at the HathiTrust

1885 establishments in Massachusetts
Consumer magazines
Hearst Communications publications
 
Magazines established in 1885
Magazines published in New York City
Magazines published in Massachusetts
Monthly magazines published in the United States
Women's magazines published in the United States
Mass media in Springfield, Massachusetts